Woodford County High School For Girls, formerly Woodford County High School (WCHS) is a secondary all-girls selective grammar school in Woodford Green of the London Borough of Redbridge, England. The school was opened in 1919. Woodford County's brother school for boys is Ilford County High School.

Woodford County High School has seven Years (7–13) . To gain a place in the lower school, children take the 11-plus exam via the local authority, the London Borough of Redbridge. Redbridge offer the top 180 girls from the 11-plus exam results a place at Woodford County High School where, upon entry, girls are allocated to one of 6 individual 'forms' of 30 students each. Every student for Years 7-13 is part of a different school 'house'. These houses are Repton (blue), Warner (yellow), Highams (green) and Newton (red). There are many roles that students are encouraged to volunteer for within the day-to-day running of the school, including representation of peers on the 'school council' and becoming 'Silver Badges' (Y12/13 6th Formers with additional responsibilities). 6th Form (Y12/13) places at the school are highly sought after, and applications to attend 6th Form are open to those who have attended schools other than Woodford County High School in Years 7 to 11. This school offers a wide range of GCSE subjects, including Classical Civilisation, psychology, and business studies, among many others.

Although the school is part of the Borough of Redbridge school system, the school buildings themselves are located in the London Borough of Waltham Forest.

History

The main school building was originally Highams Manor or Highams Park, and was built in 1768 by William Newton (1735–1790). The exterior has Ionic order pilasters and a polygonal roof lantern. Notable internal features include a stone staircase with a wrought-iron balustrade. The grounds were designed by Humphry Repton and originally included Highams Park Lake. In 1849, the house was acquired by the Warner family, who also held ownership of many properties in Walthamstow. The building was later used a hospital, in which Florence Nightingale worked, as well as a means of accommodation for Winston Churchill during the Second World War.  The site became Woodford County High school for Girls in 1919 and was extended to the north and south between 1928 and 1938. It became a Grade II listed building in 1951.

Notable former pupils

Kathleen Lonsdale (1903–1971), crystallographer
Jenny Powell, TV presenter
Lucy Kirkwood, playwright
Sarah Winman, actress and author
Jourdan Riane, model and former love island girl
Mona Chalabi, journalist

References

External links
Woodford County High School Public Website
 (original architect's drawing dated 1760).

Grammar schools in the London Borough of Redbridge
Girls' schools in London
Community schools in the London Borough of Redbridge